The Golden Reel Award for Outstanding Achievement in Sound Editing – Sound Effects and Foley for Feature Film is an annual award given by the Motion Picture Sound Editors. It honors sound editors whose work has warranted merit in the field of cinema; in this case, their work in the field of sound effects and foley. It was first awarded in 1954, for films released the previous year, under the title Best Sound Editing - Feature Film. In 1964 the award was split in two, this to honor sound effects editing, while the other honored adr. It wasn't until 1974 that the title specified that it was being awarded to sound effects, under the title Best Sound Editing - Sound Effects. The "foley" of the title wasn't recognized until 1997. Between then and 2018, the category's title fluctuated between similar variations. The award has been given under its current title since 2018.

Winners and nominees

1950s

1960s

1970s

1980s

1990s

2000s

2010s

Best Sound Editing - Sound Effects and Foley in an English Language Feature

Best Sound Editing - Sound Effects and Foley in a Feature Film

Outstanding Achievement in Sound Editing - Sound Effects and Foley for Feature Film

2020s

References

External links
Official MPSE Website

Golden Reel Awards (Motion Picture Sound Editors)